Joseph Minion (born 1957) is an American screenwriter, producer and film director, best known for his screenplays for the 1985 film After Hours and the 1989 cult film Vampire's Kiss.

Biography
Born in New Jersey in 1957, Minion briefly attended NYU Film School before finishing his studies at Columbia University for screenwriting. In 1984, Minion's script for After Hours was optioned by Griffin Dunne and Amy Robinson. Robinson sent Minion's screenplay to Scorsese, whose Last Temptation of Christ had recently fallen through; production on After Hours started shortly afterward. 

As a director, Minion made his debut for producer Roger Corman with 1987's Daddy's Boys. His last outing as director was for another low-budget feature, Trafficking (1999).

Personal life
He lives in New York and his studio is in East Orange, N.J. Throughout his career he has taught film and screenwriting at School of Visual Arts, USC, The North Carolina School of Arts, Long Island University and the New York University School of Continuing Education.

References

External links
 
 

1957 births
Living people
American male screenwriters
American television writers
Columbia University School of the Arts alumni
Film directors from New Jersey
People from Teaneck, New Jersey
Screenwriting instructors